Nusantara Awakening Party is a political party in Indonesia founded on 28 October 2021, and received legal recognition from the Ministry of Law and Human Rights on January 2022.

The party is founded and led by former Democratic Party legislator I Gede Pasek Suardika, who became the party head, along with other expelled cadres. The party is established by taking over minor party, Functional Struggle Party (Partai Karya Perjuangan), which became inactive since failure to participate in elections

The party deemed to qualify to participate in 2024 Indonesian general election, along with four other new parties, after fulfilling administrative criteria and actual verification by the KPU RI on December 2022.

History 
The party was established by former members of the Democratic Party who remained loyal to former chairman Anas Urbaningrum, who left the party and had since been imprisoned on corruption charges. The party was initiated by former legislator I Gede Pasek Suardika, who was joined by former Democratic Party cadre Ian Zulfikar, HMI activist Asral Hardi, journalist and photographer Bobby Triadi, and Sri Mulyono.

The party was declared on 28 October 2021 -- coinciding with the Youth Pledge Day -- at the final Functional Struggle Party congress, where it was transformed to Nusantara Awakening Party through changes on the party constitution. The party quickly registered the change to the Ministry of Law and Human Rights, and was recognised in 7 January 2022.

Anas himself participated in the party founding by giving advise and suggestions to its initiators, including Suardika. He later endorsed the party founding despite not giving the time of when to join the party. On February 2023, Suardika promised that Anas will be given a high-ranking position in the party after the end of his prison term expected April 2023.

Leadership 

 Chairperson: I Gede Pasek Suardika
 Deputy Chairperson: Gerry H Hukubun
 Treasurer: Mirwan Amir
 Secretary General: Sri Mulyono
 Head of Organisational Department: Pranyoto Ateng
 Head of Membership Department: Yuyun. K. Soemopawiro 
 Election Campaign Bureau Chief: Bona Simanjuntak 
 Executive Director: I Made Sudanayasa

References 

2021 establishments in Indonesia
Political parties established in 2021
Political parties in Indonesia
Pancasila political parties